Stanley High School, also known as Stanley Regional High School, is a combined middle and high school in Stanley, New Brunswick, Canada. It educates students from Stanley and surrounding areas. Approximately 150 students attend the school.

External links
 Official website

High schools in New Brunswick
Schools in York County, New Brunswick